Sir John Oliver Wright  (6 March 1922 – 1 September 2009) was a British diplomat. He was British Ambassador to West Germany from 1975 to 1981 and British Ambassador to the United States from 1982 to 1986.

Early life 
Wright was born on 6 March 1921 in Hammersmith, London, England. He was the younger son of Arthur Wright, a catering manager and hotelier, and his wife, Ethel Louisa Hicks, (née Shearod). The family moved from London to the West Midlands when Wright was very young. He was educated at Solihull School, then an all-boys private school in Solihull, West Midlands. He won a scholarship to Christ's College, Cambridge. There, he studied modern languages and specialised in German and French. Following graduation, he joined the military for service during World War II.

His studies were interrupted by World War II. He served in the Royal Naval Reserve (1941–45) and was awarded the Distinguished Service Cross. Following his service he took and passed the Foreign Office exam, thus was accepted to Her Majesty's Diplomatic Service.

Military service
In 1941, having completed his university degree, Wright joined the Royal Naval Volunteer Reserve.

Diplomatic career 

Wright's career as a Diplomat was a highly distinguished one:

 New York City (1946–47)
 Bucharest (1948–50)
 Singapore (1950–51)
 Foreign and Commonwealth Office (1952–54)
 Berlin (1954–56)
 Pretoria (1957–58)
 Imperial Defence College (1959)
 Assistant Private Secretary to Secretary of State for Foreign Affairs (1960)
 Counsellor and Private Secretary for Foreign Affairs (1963)
 Private Secretary to the Prime Minister (1964–66) (to Rt Hon. Sir Alec Douglas-Home and subsequently to Rt Hon. Harold Wilson)
 Ambassador to Denmark (1966–69)
 Deputy Home Office Representative to Northern Irish Government (Aug 1969 – Mar 1970)
 Chief Clerk, Her Majesty's Diplomatic Service (1970–72)
 Deputy Under-Secretary of State, FCO (1972–75)
 Ambassador to Federal Republic of Germany (1975–81)
 Retired from Her Majesty's Diplomatic Service
 Re-appointed, Ambassador to Washington DC (1982–86)

Having retired from the Diplomatic Service in 1981, he was elected Master of Christ's College, Cambridge. He would have become the new Master in 1982, but was recalled to the Diplomatic Service to become British Ambassador to the United States and therefore never took up the appointment.

Later life
On 1 January 1987, Wright was appointed King of Arms of the Order of St Michael and St George. This appointment is the herald, one of six officers, of the Order of St Michael and St George. In July 1996, he was succeeded in the appointment by Sir Ewen Fergusson.

Honours and decorations
On 1 December 1964, he was appointed a Companion of the Order of St Michael and St George (CMG) for his services as Private Secretary to Alec Douglas-Home from 1960 to 1964. On 26 May 1978, he was appointed Knight Grand Cross of the Royal Victorian Order (GCVO). Knight Grand Cross is the highest grade within the Royal Victorian. He was appointed GCVO following the state visit under taken by Queen Elizabeth II to West Germany between 22 and 26 May 1978.

 Distinguished Service Cross (DSC) (1944)
 Knight Commander of the Order of St Michael and St George (KCMG) (1974)
 Knight Grand Cross of the Order of St Michael and St George (GCMG) (1981)

Offices held

References

External links
Interview with Sir John Oliver Wright & transcript, British Diplomatic Oral History Programme, Churchill College, Cambridge, 1996

1922 births
2009 deaths
People educated at Solihull School
Alumni of Christ's College, Cambridge
Ambassadors of the United Kingdom to West Germany
Ambassadors of the United Kingdom to the United States
Ambassadors of the United Kingdom to Denmark
Knights Grand Cross of the Order of St Michael and St George
Knights Grand Cross of the Royal Victorian Order
Recipients of the Distinguished Service Cross (United Kingdom)
Royal Navy officers of World War II
Members of HM Diplomatic Service
Principal Private Secretaries to the Secretary of State for Foreign and Commonwealth Affairs
Royal Naval Volunteer Reserve personnel of World War II
British people in British Malaya
British expatriates in Romania
British expatriates in South Africa
20th-century British diplomats
Royal Naval Reserve personnel